Qalamun or Qalamoun may refer to:

Qalamoun Mountains, Syria
An-Nabek District, Syria
Monastery of Saint Samuel the Confessor, called Deir el-Qalamun, Egypt
Historical monastery of al-Qalamun, Eikoston, Egypt